Cornelius Christopher Cremin (6 December 1908 – 20 April 1987) was an Irish diplomat born in Kenmare, County Kerry .

One of four children, Cremin was born to a family that operated a drapery business.  His brother, Francis Cremin, became a leading academic canon lawyer who framed a number of key church documents.  He was educated at St. Brendan's College, Killarney and from 1926 at University College Cork, where he graduated with a first-class degree in Classics and Commerce.

c.1929–30 he was awarded the post-graduate University College Cork Honan scholarship; by 1930 he had attained a degree in economics and accountancy.  For the following three years he studied in Athens, Munich and Oxford, having attained a travelling scholarship in Classics.  He subsequently entered the Department of External Affairs, having succeeded in the competition for third secretary in 1935.

In April 1935 he married Patricia O'Mahony.  His first position in Dublin involved working with F.H. Boland on the League of Nations portfolio.  In 1937 he was sent abroad on his first posting to Paris.  There he worked under the 'Revolutionary Diplomat' Art O'Brien, until the latter retired in 1938.  Sean Murphy later became his Minister.  Ireland declared neutrality on the outbreak of the Second World War and Murphy and Cremin reported on the developments in France throughout the Phoney War.

After the fall of France, the Irish legation was the last to leave Paris except for the American Ambassador, on 11 June 1940.  After travelling to Ascain the legation eventually made its way to the new French Capital, Vichy, where it set about looking after the needs of Irish citizens, many of whom had been interned, as they had British passports and had been  sending political reports.  The political reports were of the highest value and ensured that Irish continued to observe pro-Allied neutrality throughout the war.

In 1943 Cremin was sent to Berlin to replace William Warnock.  Prior to his arrival the Legation was bombed.  Cremin as Chargé d'Affaires in Berlin was responsible for sending back political reports and looking after the interests of Irish citizens.  Cremin attempted, unsuccessfully, to assist some European Jews; he did however send full reports on the Nazi treatment of the Jews in Europe.  Warned to leave Berlin before the Soviets arrived, Cremin spent the last weeks of the war near the Swiss border.

In 1945 he was sent to Lisbon, where he met authoritarian president Salazar and attempted to revive Irish trade as well as reporting on the various unsuccessful coups against Salazar.

After returning to Ireland in 1946 he was involved in preparing Ireland's Marshall Plan application and tracing the development of Ireland's post war foreign policy. He had a distinguished career representing Ireland in many foreign missions and at the UN.

Postings

 Paris 1937–1940
 Vichy 1940–1943
 Berlin 1943–1945
 Lisbon 1945–1946
 Counsellor 1946–1949
 Assistant Secretary 1949–1950
 Paris 1950–1954
 Vatican 1954–1956
 London 1956–1958
 Secretary (permanent head of the foreign service) 1958–1963
 London 1963–1964
 UN 1964–1974, (Chaired UN Law of the Sea Conference Caracas), (Retired)
In retirement he was a guest lecturer in 1974 at the Law Department of University College Cork

References
 Dr. Niall Keogh, Con Cremin Ireland's Wartime Diplomat, 2006,

External reference
 Department of Foreign Affairs website, 

Irish civil servants
People from County Kerry
People educated at St Brendan's College, Killarney
Alumni of University College Cork
Grand Crosses 1st class of the Order of Merit of the Federal Republic of Germany
1908 births
1987 deaths
Ambassadors of Ireland to Germany
Ambassadors of Ireland to Portugal
Ambassadors of Ireland to the Holy See
Ambassadors of Ireland to the United Kingdom
Permanent Representatives of Ireland to the United Nations